John Gregory was a colonial politician in the eighteenth century British colony of Jamaica.

Gregory was President of the Legislative Council of Jamaica from 1735 to 1751. He was the acting Governor of Jamaica in 1735 and from 1736 to 1738.

References

Governors of Jamaica
Year of birth missing
Year of death missing
18th-century British politicians
18th century in Jamaica